Balansiae is a tribe of fungi in the family Clavicipitaceae, described in 1950. It contains endophytic fungi symbiotic with grasses and sedges.

Genera
Atkinsonella
Balansia
Balansiopsis
Epichloë
Myriogenospora

References

Clavicipitaceae